NGC 238 is a spiral galaxy located in the constellation Phoenix. It was discovered on October 2, 1834 by John Herschel.

References

0238
Barred spiral galaxies
Phoenix (constellation)
Discoveries by John Herschel
002595